The Air & Waste Management Association (abbreviated AWMA) is an international nonprofit professional organization focused on environmental protection and improving environmental decision-making. As of 2021, it has over 5,000 professional members in 65 countries, and it has 34 sections and 65 chapters around the world. It was founded in June 1907 by a group of smoke inspectors in Milwaukee, Wisconsin. Its original name was the International Association for the Prevention of Smoke, and its name was subsequently changed several times to reflect changes in its members' interests. Specifically, it was renamed the Smoke Prevention Association of America in 1915, the Air Pollution Control Association in 1950, and obtained its current name in 1988.

References

External links

Organizations established in 1907
Environmental organizations based in Pennsylvania
1907 establishments in Wisconsin
Non-profit organizations based in Pittsburgh
Professional associations based in the United States